Austin Powers: International Man of Mystery (or simply Austin Powers) is a 1997 American spy comedy film directed by Jay Roach. It is the first installment in the Austin Powers series. It stars franchise co-producer and writer Mike Myers, playing the roles of Austin Powers and Dr. Evil, Powers' arch-enemy. Supporting roles are played by Elizabeth Hurley, Robert Wagner, Seth Green, and Michael York. The film is a parody of the James Bond films and other popular culture from the 1960s, centering on a flamboyant, promiscuous secret agent and a criminal mastermind, arch-nemeses who go into and come out of cryostasis at the same time as each other as their conflict spans decades.

The film, which cost US$16.5 million, opened on May 2, 1997, grossing US$53 million from its North American release and over $67 million worldwide. The film spawned two sequels, Austin Powers: The Spy Who Shagged Me (1999) and Austin Powers in Goldmember (2002).

In the years following Austin Powers in Goldmember, Myers has discussed the possibility of a fourth film.

Plot
In 1967, British spy Austin Powers thwarts an assassination attempt by his nemesis Dr. Evil in a London nightclub. Dr. Evil escapes to space in a rocket and cryogenically freezes himself. Austin volunteers to be placed into cryostasis in case Dr. Evil returns in the future.

Thirty years later, Dr. Evil returns to discover his henchman Number 2 has developed Virtucon, the legitimate front of Evil's empire, into a multibillion-dollar enterprise. Uninterested in business, Dr. Evil conspires to steal nuclear weapons and hold the world hostage for $1 million. He increases his demand to $100 billion when he learns that the value of the dollar has fallen due to inflation. Dr. Evil also learns that, during his absence, his associates have artificially created his son, Scott Evil, using his frozen semen. Now a Generation X teenager, Scott is resentful of his father's absence and resists his attempts to get closer to him.

Having learned of Dr. Evil's return, the British Ministry of Defence unfreezes Austin, acclimatizing him to the 1990s with the help of agent Vanessa Kensington, the daughter of his 1960s sidekick Mrs. Kensington. Posing as a married couple, Austin and Vanessa track Number 2 to Las Vegas and meet his Italian secretary, Alotta Fagina. Austin infiltrates Fagina's penthouse suite and discovers Dr. Evil's plans to drill a nuclear warhead into the Earth's core and trigger volcanic eruptions worldwide. Fagina discovers Austin and seduces him to learn his identity. Dr. Evil and his entourage conspire to defeat Austin by creating a series of fembots: beautiful female androids equipped with machine guns concealed in their breasts.

Austin and Vanessa infiltrate the Virtucon headquarters but are apprehended by Dr. Evil's henchman, Random Task. Meanwhile, the United Nations accede to the demands of Dr. Evil, who proceeds with his plan nonetheless. Austin and Vanessa escape Dr. Evil's death trap and Vanessa is sent for help. While searching for Dr. Evil, Austin is confronted by the fembots. He seduces them with a striptease that makes them explode.

British forces raid the underground lair, while Austin deactivates the doomsday device. He confronts Dr. Evil, but Fagina arrives holding Vanessa hostage. They are interrupted by Number 2, who attempts to betray Dr. Evil by making a deal with Austin. Dr. Evil uses a trap door to send Number 2 plummeting into the fire pit, then activates the base's self-destruct mechanism and escapes. Austin and Vanessa evacuate the lair before it explodes.

Three months later, Austin and Vanessa are married. During their honeymoon, Austin is attacked by Random Task. He subdues him using a penis pump, which he before claimed was not his, allowing Vanessa to knock him out. The newlyweds adjourn to the balcony. Among the stars, Austin spots the cryogenic chamber of Dr. Evil, who vows revenge.

Cast

 Mike Myers as Austin Powers and Dr. Evil
 Elizabeth Hurley as Vanessa Kensington
 Robert Wagner as Number 2
 Seth Green as Scott Evil
 Mindy Sterling as Frau Farbissina
 Michael York as Basil Exposition
 Fabiana Udenio as Alotta Fagina
 Will Ferrell as Mustafa
 Mimi Rogers as Mrs. Kensington
 Joe Son as Random Task
 Paul Dillon as Paddy O'Brien
 Charles Napier as Commander Gilmour
 Elya Baskin as General Borschevsky
 Clint Howard as Johnson Ritter
 Neil Mullarkey as Quartermaster Clerk
 Tom Arnold as Texan (uncredited)
 Carrie Fisher as Therapist (uncredited)
 Larry Thomas as Casino Dealer
 Burt Bacharach as Himself
 Michael McDonald as Henchman Steve
 Cindy Margolis as Fembot
Deleted scenes:
 Lois Chiles as Steve's Step-wife
 Christian Slater as Hypnotized Guard (UK Version only)
 Rob Lowe as John's Friend (Bill)

Production

Inspiration
Mike Myers created the character of Austin Powers for the faux 1960s rock band Ming Tea that Myers started with Matthew Sweet and Susanna Hoffs following his Saturday Night Live stint in the early 1990s. Myers said that the movie and the character were inspired by the British films, music and comedy of the 1960s and 70s his father had introduced him to as a child. "After my dad died in 1991, I was taking stock of his influence on me as a person and his influence on me with comedy in general. So Austin Powers was a tribute to my father, who [introduced me to] James Bond, Peter Sellers, the Beatles, The Goodies, Peter Cook and Dudley Moore". Myers also said hearing the Burt Bacharach song "The Look of Love" on the radio led to him reminiscing about the 1960s, which helped inspire the movie. Dana Carvey, Myers' long-time collaborator on Saturday Night Live and the Wayne's World movies, felt that the character of Dr. Evil was copied from Carvey's impression of long-time SNL executive producer Lorne Michaels and was unhappy about it.

Casting

Myers sought Jim Carrey to play Dr. Evil, as his initial plan was not to play multiple characters in the series. Carrey was interested in the part, but had to turn the role down due to scheduling conflicts with Liar Liar.

Since the 1960s had a big influence on his childhood, Myers cast Robert Wagner and Michael York, two household names from the late 1960s, in key supporting roles. The popularity of the film revived both Wagner's and York's careers. Myers has referred to Wagner as "the coolest guy I know" and York as "the classiest guy I know." Rhea Perlman was in talks to play Frau Farbissina, but had scheduling conflicts. She has always regretted turning the movie down. Colin Quinn turned down the role of Scott Evil and expressed regret for declining the part.

Myers estimated that 30–40% of the film was improvised. Filming locations included Millennium Biltmore Hotel and Stardust Resort & Casino on the Las Vegas Strip.

Reception

Box office 
Austin Powers: International Man Of Mystery opened on May 2, 1997 to $9.5 million in North American theaters, coming in second that weekend to the thriller film Breakdown, a Paramount release which opened with $12.3 million. In its second weekend, Austin Powers fell to $7 million. Its overall take after it left theaters was $53.8m domestically and $13.8m overseas for a worldwide total of $67.8 million, four times the amount of its production budget.

The low grosses in the UK have been partly attributed to the death of Princess Diana, which occurred in August 1997 just prior to the film's UK September release date. The film grew a steady following due to strong word-of-mouth and its release on VHS and DVD.

Critical reception 
Austin Powers: International Man of Mystery received positive reviews. The film has acquired a 73% approval rating on Rotten Tomatoes, based on 71 reviews, with an average rating on 6.5/10. The site's critical consensus reads, "A light and goofy comedy which provides laughs, largely due to performances and screenwriting by Myers."

Roger Ebert of the Chicago Sun-Times gave the film three stars out of four, calling it "a funny movie that only gets funnier the more familiar you are with the James Bond movies, all the Bond clones and countless other 1960s films." Time Out New York critic Andrew Johnston observed: "The film's greatest asset is its gentle tone: rejecting the smug cynicism of Naked Gun-style parodies, it never loses the earnest naiveté of the psychedelic era."

Malcolm Johnson of the Hartford Courant praised Myers' turn in multiple roles, writing "Myers, flashing his cruddy grin as Austin and doing implacable slow burns as Evil, again proves himself a gifted comic with a knack for transformation. But he needs to find a director who will spin out his best ideas and toss out the worst ones. With [Jay] Roach at the helm, 'Austin Powers' is less than groovy."

Home media
Austin Powers: International Man of Mystery was released to region 1 double-sided DVD on October 22, 1997, with widescreen and full screen versions on opposing sides of the disc. It was one of the first movies to be released in the DVD market. The widescreen transfer is unusual in that it is a modified version of the theatrical ratio: despite being filmed in 2.39:1 aspect ratio, on DVD it is presented as 2:1 ratio, "as specified by the director" according to the disc packaging. The film was featured in the correct theatrical aspect ratio for the first time when it was released on Blu-ray in the Austin Powers Collection.

All versions of the film released on home video (including VHS) have two alternate endings and a set of deleted scenes, which were then rare to include on VHS. The DVD and Blu-ray versions also feature a commentary. However, all US versions of the film are the 89-minute PG-13 cut, with edits to sexual humor/language. International versions are uncut and 94 minutes long (assuming the correct frame rate).

Legacy
Daniel Craig, who portrayed James Bond on screen from 2006 to 2021, credited the Austin Powers franchise with the relatively serious tone of later Bond films. In a 2014 interview, Craig said, "We had to destroy the myth because Mike Myers fucked us", making it "impossible" to do the gags of earlier Bond films which Austin Powers satirized.

Awards

See also
 Outline of James Bond
 List of films set in Las Vegas

References

External links

 
 
 

1997 films
1997 action comedy films
1990s parody films
1990s spy comedy films
American action comedy films
American parody films
American robot films
American spy comedy films
Android (robot) films
1
Cryonics in fiction
1990s English-language films
Films about twin brothers
Films directed by Jay Roach
Films scored by George S. Clinton
Films set in 1967
Films set in 1997
Films set in the Las Vegas Valley
Films set in London
Films set in a fictional country
Films shot in the Las Vegas Valley
Films shot in Los Angeles
Films with screenplays by Mike Myers
New Line Cinema films
1997 comedy films
Films produced by Suzanne Todd
1990s American films